Cubana de Aviación Flight 310 was a scheduled international flight from José Martí International Airport, Havana, Cuba, to Arturo Michelena International Airport, Valencia, Venezuela, which crashed near Bejuma, Venezuela, on 25 December 1999. All 22 people on board were killed.

Aircraft
The aircraft involved was a Yakovlev Yak-42D, registration CU-T1285. The aircraft was manufactured in 1991 as msn 4520424914068.

Accident

The flight had departed José Martí International Airport, Havana, Cuba, bound for Simón Bolívar International Airport in Caracas, Venezuela. Due to mudslides and flooding, the flight was diverted to Arturo Michelena International Airport in Valencia. The aircraft was held for 40 minutes.

As Flight 310 started its approach to Valencia Airport the aircraft struck the San Luis Hill. The aircraft crashed near the town of Bejuma. All 22 passengers and crew died in the crash, which happened at 20:18 local time (00:48, 26 December UTC).

Passengers and crew
The nationalities of the victims of Flight 310 were-

See also

 Cubana de Aviación accidents and incidents

References

External links
Photo of wreckage

Aviation accidents and incidents in 1999
Aviation accidents and incidents in Venezuela
1999 in Venezuela
Accidents and incidents involving the Yakovlev Yak-42
December 1999 events in South America
1999 disasters in Venezuela